Shirju Posht may refer to:
 Shirju Posht-e Bala
 Shirju Posht-e Pain
 Shirju Posht Rural District